Find Shelter is the debut album from musician and producer Noah Georgeson.

Track listing
 "Tied to the Mountains" – 2:20
 "Walking on Someone Else's Name" – 3:04
 "Find Shelter" – 2:37
 "Build and Work" – 2:48
 "Hand Me, Please, A City" – 2:04
 "Priests of Cholera" – 4:03
 "Glorious Glory" – 3:07
 "Anvil" – 3:22
 "Wooden Empire" – 2:57
 "Shawm Overture" – 0:42
 "Tied to the Coast" – 4:26
 "Angry Afternoon" – 3:42

2006 albums
Folk rock albums by American artists